Eucalyptus paralimnetica is a species of small tree that is endemic to the southwest of Western Australia. It has smooth, pinkish grey bark, linear to narrow lance-shaped adult leaves, flower buds in groups of seven and conical fruit.

Description
It has smooth, pale pinkish grey bark. Young plants and coppice regrowth have egg-shaped leaves at first, later narrow lance-shaped.

Taxonomy
Eucalyptus paralimnetica was first described in 2001 by Lawrie Johnson and Ken Hill in the journal Telopea from material collected on the road to Peak Charles in 1986. This species is not accepted at the Western Australian Herbarium but is accepted at the Australian Plant Census. The specific epithet (paralimnetica) means "near lakes".

Distribution and habitat
This eucalypt grows in woodland, often at the edges of salt pans, from near Peak Charles to the Fraser Range.

See also
List of Eucalyptus species

References

Eucalypts of Western Australia
Trees of Australia
paralimnetica
Myrtales of Australia
Plants described in 2001
Taxa named by Lawrence Alexander Sidney Johnson
Taxa named by Ken Hill (botanist)